The Mercedes-Benz M113 (and similar M155) engine is a gasoline-fueled, spark-ignition internal-combustion V8 automobile engine family used in the 2000s.  It is based on the similar M112 V6 introduced in 1998, then later phased out in 2007 for the M156 AMG engine and the M273 engine.

The standard Mercedes-Benz M113s were built in Untertürkheim, Germany, while the AMG versions were assembled at AMG's Affalterbach, Germany plant. M113s have aluminum/silicon (Alusil) engine blocks and aluminum SOHC cylinder heads with two spark plugs per cylinder. The cylinder heads have 3 valves per cylinder (two intake, one exhaust). Other features include Sequential fuel injection, iron coated piston skirts, fracture-split forged steel connecting rods, a one-piece cast camshaft, and a magnesium intake manifold.

M113 43
The M113 43 is a  version.

Applications:
 1997-2000 C 43 AMG
 1997-2002 E 430
 1998-2003 CLK 430
 1999-2001 ML 430
 1999-2006 S 430

M113 50
Active Cylinder Control variable displacement technology is optional.

Applications:
 1998-2008 G 500
 1999-2006 S 500
 1999-2006 SL 500
 2000-2006 CL 500
 2001-2008 ML 500
 2002-2006 CLK 500
 2002-2006 E 500
 2004-2006 CLS 500
 2006-2007 R 500
 2008-2017 SsangYong Chairman W

M113 55

The M113 55 is a  version with the same  bore as the M113 50/500 but with a longer  stroke developed by Mercedes-AMG. These cars were the first to carry the 55 AMG title. Many popular tuners such as Kleemann USA and AMG itself developed supercharger systems for this model, mirroring the later M113K design.

Applications:
 1997-2000 C 55 AMG
 1998-2001 SL 55 AMG
 1998-2002 E 55 AMG
 2000-2002 S 55 AMG
 2000-2003 ML 55 AMG
 2000-2003 CLK 55 AMG
 2002-2006 CLK 55 AMG
 2001-2002 CL 55 AMG
 1999-2003 G 55 AMG
 2004-2010 SLK 55 AMG
 2006-2008 SLK 55 AMG Black Series
 2005-2007 C 55 AMG

M113K - Kompressor
The M113 Kompressor is a supercharged and twin-intercooled version of the  M113. It is commonly referred to as "M113K" - where 'K' stands for Kompressor (supercharger).
 
Many Mercedes-AMG enthusiasts consider the M113K as the last of the great Kompressor engines used by Mercedes-AMG excluding the Mercedes SLR McLaren. Mercedes-AMG replaced this model with their new 6.2 L naturally aspirated V8, making the transition from 55 AMG to the 63 AMG. Although the new 6.2 L M156 AMG motor produced greater peak horsepower, many enthusiasts were disappointed by the lack of torque present in the new naturally aspirated design. The M113K engine has also received praise for its reliability.

Applications:
 2003-2006 CL 55 AMG
 2002-2006 S 55 AMG
 2002-2008 SL 55 AMG
 2003-2006 E 55 AMG
 2004-2006 CLK DTM AMG
 2004-2011 G 55 AMG
 2004-2006 CLS 55 AMG
2005 Fisker Tramonto V8
2005 Laraki Fulgura V8

M155

The M155 is a version of the supercharged  M113 specifically for the Mercedes-Benz SLR McLaren.

Applications:
 2004 Mercedes-Benz SLR McLaren
 2006 Mercedes-Benz SLR McLaren 722 Edition

See also
 List of Mercedes-Benz engines

References

M113
V8 engines
Gasoline engines by model